Koshelevka is a rural locality (a selo) in Mikhaylovsky Selsoviet, Duvansky District, Bashkortostan, Russia. The population was 3 as of 2010. There is 1 street.

Geography 
Koshelevka is located 36 km west of Mesyagutovo (the district's administrative centre) by road. Yezhovka is the nearest rural locality.

References 

Rural localities in Duvansky District